Kosinskoye is a rural locality (a selo) in Krasnoselskoye Rural Settlement, Yuryev-Polsky District, Vladimir Oblast, Russia. The population was 729 as of 2010. There are 12 streets.

Geography 
Kosinskoye is located 10 km west of Yuryev-Polsky (the district's administrative centre) by road. Afineyevo is the nearest rural locality.

References 

Rural localities in Yuryev-Polsky District